Søren Sebber Larsen  (born 1966) is a Danish composer as well as an accomplished multi-instrumentalist, playing the guitar, keyboards drums. He released an album entitled "String Man" where he performs well-known classic songs from other artists on the guitar.

See also
List of Danish composers

References

Official homepage
The Doc Tele Caster
String Man

Danish composers
Male composers
1966 births
Living people
Place of birth missing (living people)